The Secretary of the California Senate is a nonpartisan officer of the Senate and is elected at the beginning of each two-year session. The secretary's primary role is the chief parliamentarian of the Senate (Senate Rule 9, Standing Rules of the Senate. See S.R. 4, 2007-08 Regular Session).  The secretary also oversees the clerical workforce on the floor of the California State Senate.  This workforce includes staff responsible for producing the daily files, histories, and journals of the Senate, as well as clerks that amend, engross, and enroll bills. The secretary is also responsible for recording votes on the Senate floor.

The secretary is one of three non-member officers selected for each two-year session; the body also appoints a chaplain and sergeant-at-arms. (California's Legislature (2006 edition), California State Assembly: Sacramento. p. 149)

The current secretary of the Senate is Erika Contreras, who was first elected on December 3, 2018.

The longest-serving secretary of the Senate was Joseph Beek, who served from 1919 to 1968 (with the exception of 1921, when he did not serve).

Sources and more information 
Entire text of California's Legislature book is posted online here
 California Senate web site. Contains links to Secretary's homepage
 Rules of the Senate (Senate Resolution 4, 2007-08 Regular Session)

References

California State Legislature
California State Senate